Horatia Dorothy Moloney Lancaster (29 September 1878 - 1 December 1921) (variously known as Dorothy, Mary, Dolly, Miss Maloney and Miss Molony, Moloney and O'Connor) was an Irish suffragette campaigner and member of the Women's Social and Political Union (WSPU). She became Organiser to the London Council of the Women's Freedom League in 1908, following its split from the WSPU. She famously disrupted the 1908 Dundee by-election by ringing a bell every time Winston Churchill attempted to address a crowd demanding that he apologize for insulting remarks he had made about the women's suffrage movement.

Early life 
Moloney was born Horatia O'Connor to Edward O'Connor and Henrica Croasdella Moloney in Sandycove, Co. Dublin on 29 September 1878. The family later moved to Bray, Co. Wicklow. She moved to London and married Egbert T. Lancaster in 1911.

1908 Dundee by-election 

Dundee experienced a comparatively high amount of suffrage activity in 1908 due to the then prime minister, H.H. Asquith holding the seat for the neighbouring constituency of East Fife and Winston Churchill standing as Liberal MP in Dundee in the 1908 by-election.

The Women's Social and Political Union were active in the campaign with Mary Gawthorpe, Emmeline Pankhurst and Christabel Pankhurst holding meetings in Dundee. However, they were upstaged by the non-violent Women's Freedom League member Dorothy Malony who came up from London for the campaign. Whenever Churchill spoke, Moloney produced and rang a hand bell which drowned out what he was saying. The ding-dong exchanges were taken in fun initially, but some meetings had to be cancelled because of the uproar. The Irish Times newspaper published an account of the by-election on 5 May 1908 that supported claims that Moloney had followed Churchill around for a week."[Maloney] complained of a passage in a speech which the latter delivered on Saturday last, and in which, alluding to the women’s suffrage movement, he said – “I have seen with some regret some most earnest advocates of the cause allying themselves with the forces of drink and reaction. They were carried shoulder-high, I am informed, by the rowdy elements, which are always to be found at a public house-made manifestation.”… Amid great laughter Miss Maloney retorted that if any man attempted to lift her in his arms she would have boxed his ears…

"At the time appointed for him to address the meeting (and when there were about 500 or 600 present), Mr. Churchill drove up in his motor car only to find that the gathering was in full possession of the ladies... who had the sympathy of a goodly majority of the crowd... Mr. Churchill re-entered the vehicle and was about to speak from it when the Suffragette carriage came up, a lady inside loudly ringing a bell. The carriage drew close up to the motor, the bell clanging all the time, and creating so much din...

"The lady said to be Miss Maloney shook her fist at the right hon. gentleman, and exclaimed in a loud voice, “Who is the strongest — an Irish woman or Mr. Winston Churchill?”While in Scotland, Moloney addressed WFL groups in Dundee and Aberdeenshire. Her by-election protest was widely reported in the press. A bell ringing contest in Aberdeenshire later that year was reported on with the headline "Miss Maloney Overshadowed" and an illustration featuring her.

Subsequent activity 
At a WFL protest in the House of Commons in October 1908, "Miss Maloney of 'bell' fame" led a group of four protesters to climb the Coeur de Lion statue. She was subsequently arrested, but her fine of £5 was paid by a friend "much to her chagrin".

Death and legacy 
Moloney died shortly after giving birth to a son at her home in Richmond, London in 1921. Her obituary appeared in The Vote newspaper: "all the old members of the Women's Freedom League were deeply grieved to hear of the death, after a short illness, of our old comrade, Dolly Malony, the bright and bonny and resourceful little Irish girl, who rang the bell at Mr. Churchill's historic Dundee election, when the women decided he should not be allowed to speak".

She appears on the Roll of Honour of Suffragette Prisoners as Miss Maloney. The moniker "La Belle Maloney", a reference to her bell ringing exploits, was reported by Sylvia Pankhurst.

A song  has been written about her bell-ringing exploits by Glasgow singer/songwriter Lainey Dempsey.

References 

Scottish suffragettes
Place of birth missing
Place of death missing
Women's Social and Political Union
Women's Freedom League
1921 deaths
1878 births